Still Green is an American drama film directed by Jon Artigo, written by Georgia Menides, produced by Menides, Doug Lloyd, and Andrea Ajemian, and starring Sarah Jones, Ryan Kelley, Douglas Spain, Noah Segan, Paul Costa, Brandon Meyer, Ashleigh Snyder, Michael Strynkowski, Nicole Komendat and Gricel Castineira. The film also features American Idol finalist Vonzell Solomon in her acting debut. It was shot throughout Southwest Florida, including Bonita Beach, Naples, and Port Charlotte. The film was shown at film festivals and was released on DVD on October 13, 2009. Still Green was made by Uncovered Productions and Artigo/Ajemian Films.

Plot
A group of high school graduates rent a beach house the summer before going their separate ways.  An accident in the ocean tests their friendship.  The teens respond to the tragedy in a way some people find disturbing and others see as a passive act of loyalty. Free-spirited Kerri (Sarah Jones) is still coping with the loss of her father, and her mother's refusal to honor his last wish. A recent break-up has unearthed these feelings, triggering spontaneous and unhealthy relationships with her friends.  Alan (Ryan Kelley) struggles with his conflicting feelings about Kerri and about his girlfriend.

Cast
Sarah Jones as Kerri
Ryan Kelley as Alan
Douglas Spain as Bill
Noah Segan as Sean
Paul Costa as Brandon
Brandon Meyer as Daneck
Ashleigh Snyder as Monica
Michael Strynkowski as George
Nicole Komendat as Amanda
Gricel Castineira as Lisa
Vonzell Solomon as Chelsea

Soundtrack
The soundtrack of Still Green was released in 2007. It featured alternative rock music from various artists, such as Bishop Allen, Jump, Orange Island, and The Curtain Society.

Track listing

References

External links
 Official website
 

2007 films
Films shot in Florida
2007 drama films
American drama films
2000s English-language films
2000s American films